Noah Musingku, under the name "King David Peii II", claims to be head of the twin "kingdoms" of Papaala and Me’ekamui on Bougainville Island in the North Solomon Islands Noah Musingku is not the head of anything, nor is he a king. Musingku is the creator of U-Vistract which was banned as a pyramid scheme in Papua New Guinea. After the banning of U-vistract in Papua New Guinea, Musingku fled to Bougainville taking advantage of the political situation on
Boigainville to avoid prosecution and the aggrieved investors of U-vistract whom he had swindled millions of Kina from.
 As of November 2020, his "kingdoms" remain at large, mainly due to fears of destabilising the island and because many of the local authorities have invested in him. Musinku's influence in Bougainville is widely considered one of the chief problems facing President of the Autonomous Region of Bougainville Ishmael Toroama in his attempts to stabilise Bougainville in preparation for its independence.

Background
Bougainville Island is geographically and ethnically a part of the Solomon Island archipelago.  It was an autonomous region of Papua New Guinea (PNG).  In 1988 a civil war began with workers and landowners from Panguna mine (See also Panguna). This mine, owned by the PNG government and Bougainville Copper, a subsidiary of Rio Tinto Group, was established under Australian aegis.

A Unilateral Declaration of Independence was made on 17 May 1990, but Australian and New Zealand-brokered peace talks tended to ignore this fact.  Francis Ona controlled over half of the island, and proclaimed himself king of Me’ekamui ("holy land") in May 2004.  Musingku assumed the throne of Paapala Kingdom, as well as his 500-man "Me'ekamui Defense Force" in the same year, and upon Ona's death from malaria in July 2005, Musingku consolidated control of the "Twin Kingdoms" on Bougainville Island.

U-Vistract

In 1997, seven years after the unilateral declaration of independence, the Bougainville Revolutionary Army was in control of the island, but its leadership split into factions. Ona was in control of the army, and sought full independence. His co-president in the Bougainville Interim Government, Joseph Kabui, sought rapprochement with PNG and formation of an Autonomous Bougainville Government.  Musingku met with each of them as a mediator, and by 19 December 1997
had signed agreements with each. They jointly realized that it would be impossible to achieve political independence without financial sovereignty. As Musingku's wrote,

In other words, Bougainville needed to create her own independent and sovereign system in order to be free from the control of the other international financial and governing structure. Also, it was very clear that the funds we needed to work with in uprooting, pulling down, destroying and overthrowing the existing foreign control system could not be earned through the conventional system. A new international system needed to be established whose control and coordination would not be based overseas but right here on our own soil.

At first, the "U-Vistract Mission" was established as a Christian mission program in Australia.  Australian Securities and Investments Commission (ASIC) found it to be an unlicensed securities and investment program.

Within a few years, some 70,000 Papua New Guineans had deposited K350 million into U-Vistract alone. U-Vistract also attracted followers in Australia, Solomon Islands and Fiji. In Australia, a small number of Queensland investors contributed some AUD500,000 between July and October 1999.

"On 19 October 1999 in one of my trips to Australia the ASIC placed me under house-arrest…. After a heavy interrogatory session they demanded me to shut down all my operations in the country. The ASIC publicized the matter in the media to let the world of Australia know about the so-called illegal operations. However, U-Vistract grew even stronger, gaining momentum almost overnight. The number of my agencies grew in Kempsey, Sydney, Brisbane, Gold coast, etc."

From Australia, he went to Port Moresby, Papua New Guinea. While in Port Moresby, he tried to set up a bank in the old Hawaiian Bank building, but he was shut down by the PNG government and forced to leave to the Solomon Islands. He began again to set up his system, but the Australian police in the Regional Assistance Mission to Solomon Islands (RAMSI) forced him out. In 2003 he travelled to Ona's headquarters in Guava, Panguna, Bougainville, and established a bank there. Two years later he was able to travel to his ancestral village of Tonu, where he established his bank headquarters in an old cattle farm owned by the paramount chief.

Beliefs
A Pentecostal Christian, most of his talks and writings are generously sprinkled with biblical references. U-Vistract was initially created as a Christian Mission, and this has continued to be its focus. Musingku has compared his life and mission to that of Biblical saviors Noah, Moses or Jesus Christ. On the new currency that he intends to issue, pictures of Jesus will join the likenesses of Musingku and other Bougainvillean leaders.

Fijian Soldiers Incident

Musingku in 2005 announced that he was hiring a security force from Fiji to train his guards and other governmental personnel, as well as establish security and satellite and other telecommunications for his bank in Tonu. He said that this Fijian security force had been hand selected "mostly Born-Again Christians with overseas experience in Iraq and other areas".

References

Papua New Guinean politicians
Papua New Guinean independence activists
People from the Autonomous Region of Bougainville
Heads of state of states with limited recognition
Oceanian monarchs
Oceanian kings
Bougainvillean activists